N'Gribo is a village in central Ivory Coast. It is in the sub-prefecture of Anoumaba, M'Batto Department, Moronou Region, Lacs District.

Until 2012, N'Gribo was in the commune of N'Gribo-Takikro. In March 2012, N'Gribo-Takikro became one of 1126 communes nationwide that were abolished.

Notes

Populated places in Lacs District
Populated places in Moronou Region